Gold Award for Best Television Show (Fiction) is an award given as part of its annual Gold Awards for Indian television, to recognize the most popular fiction show of the year.

The award was first awarded in 2007 under the title Best Fiction Show of the Year.

List of winners

2000s
 2007 Saat Phere: Saloni Ka Safar - Sphere Origins - Sujoy Wadhwa
 Kasamh Se – Balaji Telefilms – Ekta Kapoor and Shobha Kapoor
 Left Right Left – DJ's a Creative Unit – Tony Singh and Deeya Singh
 Viraasat – Chopra Films – B. R. Chopra and Ravi Chopra
 Banoo Main Teri Dulhann - Shakuntalam Telefilms - Shyamashis Bhattacharya and Neelima Bajpaie
 Virrudh - Applause Entertainment and Ugraya Entertainment - Smriti Zubin Irani
 2008 Sapna Babul Ka...Bidaai - Director Kut's Productions - Rajan Shahi
 Banoo Main Teri Dulhann - Shakuntalam Telefilms - Shyamashis Bhattacharya and Neelima Bajpaie
 Kasamh Se – Balaji Telefilms – Ekta Kapoor and Shobha Kapoor
 Kayamath – Balaji Telefilms – Ekta Kapoor and Shobha Kapoor
 Kis Desh Mein Hai Meraa Dil – Balaji Telefilms – Ekta Kapoor and Shobha Kapoor
 Dill Mill Gayye - Cinevistaas Limited - Prem Krishen Malhotra and Sunil Malhotra

2010s
 2010 Yeh Rishta Kya Kehlata Hai - Director Kut's Productions - Rajan Shahi
 Sapna Babul Ka...Bidaai - Director Kut's Productions - Rajan Shahi
 Pavitra Rishta – Balaji Telefilms – Ekta Kapoor and Shobha Kapoor
 Bandini – Balaji Telefilms – Ekta Kapoor and Shobha Kapoor
 Uttaran – Film Farm India – Pintoo Guha and Rupali Guha
 Mann Kee Awaaz Pratigya - Walkwater Media - Pearl Grey
 Balika Vadhu - Sphere Origins - Sujoy Wadhwa
 2011 Pavitra Rishta – Balaji Telefilms – Ekta Kapoor and Shobha Kapoor
 Yahan Main Ghar Ghar Kheli – Rajshri Productions – Sooraj Barjatya
 Uttaran – Film Farm India – Pintoo Guha and Rupali Guha
 Mann Kee Awaaz Pratigya - Walkwater Media - Pearl Grey
 Yeh Rishta Kya Kehlata Hai - Director Kut's Productions - Rajan Shahi
 Balika Vadhu - Sphere Origins - Sujoy Wadhwa
 2012 Diya Aur Baati Hum – Shashi Sumeet Productions - Sumeet Mittal and Shashi Mittal
 Pavitra Rishta – Balaji Telefilms – Ekta Kapoor and Shobha Kapoor
  Bade Achhe Lagte Hain – Balaji Telefilms – Ekta Kapoor and Shobha Kapoor
 Parichay - Nayee Zindagi Kay Sapno Ka – Balaji Telefilms – Ekta Kapoor and Shobha Kapoor
 Yeh Rishta Kya Kehlata Hai - Director Kut's Productions - Rajan Shahi
 2013 Qubool Hai – 4 Lions Films – Gul Khan
 Saraswatichandra - SLB Productions - Sanjay Leela Bhansali
 Diya Aur Baati Hum – Shashi Sumeet Productions - Sumeet Mittal and Shashi Mittal
  Bade Achhe Lagte Hain – Balaji Telefilms – Ekta Kapoor and Shobha Kapoor
 Parichay - Nayee Zindagi Kay Sapno Ka – Balaji Telefilms – Ekta Kapoor and Shobha Kapoor
 Pyaar Ka Dard Hai Meetha Meetha Pyaara Pyaara - Rajshri Productions - Kavita K. Barjatya
 2014 Diya Aur Baati Hum - Shashi Sumeet Productions - Sumeet Mittal and Shashi Mittal
 Ye Hai Mohabbatein – Balaji Telefilms – Ekta Kapoor and Shobha Kapoor
 Devon Ke Dev...Mahadev - Triangle Film Company - Nikhil Sinha
 Mahabharat - Swastik Productions - Siddharth Kumar Tiwari
 Rangrasiya - Tequila Shots Productions - Saurabh Tiwari
 2015 Saath Nibhaana Saathiya - Rashmi Sharma Telefilms - Rashmi Sharma
Kumkum Bhagya – Balaji Telefilms – Ekta Kapoor and Shobha Kapoor
 Sasural Simar Ka – Rashmi Sharma Telefilms - Rashmi Sharma
 Yeh Hai Mohabbatein – Balaji Telefilms - Ekta Kapoor and Shobha Kapoor
 Udaan Sapno Ki – Gurudev Bhalla Productions - Mahesh Bhatt
 Diya Aur Baati Hum – Shashi Sumeet Productions - Sumeet Mittal and Shashi Mittal
 2016 Kumkum Bhagya – Balaji Telefilms – Ekta Kapoor and Shobha Kapoor
 Ye Hai Mohabbatein – Balaji Telefilms – Ekta Kapoor and Shobha Kapoor
 Sasural Simar Ka – Rashmi Sharma Telefilms - Rashmi Sharma
 Jamai Raja – Grazing Goat Pictures - Ashvini Yardi and Akshay Kumar
 Diya Aur Baati Hum – Shashi Sumeet Productions - Sumeet Mittal and Shashi Mittal
 2017 Kumkum Bhagya – Balaji Telefilms – Ekta Kapoor and Shobha Kapoor
 Ye Hai Mohabbatein – Balaji Telefilms – Ekta Kapoor and Shobha Kapoor
 Kasam Tere Pyaar Ki – Balaji Telefilms – Ekta Kapoor and Shobha Kapoor
 Shakti - Astitva Ke Ehsaas Ki – Rashmi Sharma Telefilms – Rashmi Sharma
 Ishqbaaz – 4 Lions Films – Gul Khan
 2018 Kumkum Bhagya – Balaji Telefilms – Ekta Kapoor and Shobha Kapoor 
 Kundali Bhagya – Balaji Telefilms – Ekta Kapoor and Shobha Kapoor
 Bepannah – Cinevistaas Limited – Prem Krishen Malhotra
 Shakti - Astitva Ke Ehsaas Ki – Rashmi Sharma Telefilms – Rashmi Sharma
 Kullfi Kumarr Bajewala – 4 Lions Films – Gul Khan
 Ishq Subhan Allah – Creative Eye Limited – Dheeraj Kumar
 2019 Kundali Bhagya – Balaji Telefilms – Ekta Kapoor and Shobha Kapoor (tied with) Yeh Rishta Kya Kehlata Hai - Director's Kut Productions - Rajan Shahi
Kumkum Bhagya – Balaji Telefilms – Ekta Kapoor and Shobha Kapoor
 Kasautii Zindagii Kay – Balaji Telefilms – Ekta Kapoor and Shobha Kapoor
 Shakti - Astitva Ke Ehsaas Ki – Rashmi Sharma Telefilms – Rashmi Sharma
 Kullfi Kumarr Bajewala – 4 Lions Films – Gul Khan
 Yeh Rishtey Hain Pyaar Ke - Director Kut's Productions - Rajan Shahi

References

Gold Awards